The Nobility Law (full name: Law concerning modifications and closer determinations of the Norwegian Nobility's rights;  or Lov, angaaende Modificationer og nærmere Bestemmelser af den Norske Adels Rettigheder) was passed by the national parliament in Norway, the Storting, on 1 August 1821. It abolished noble titles and privileges within two generations and required legal proof of nobility in the meantime.

The law reflected the democratic philosophy of the Storting's majority, and was passed effectively unanimously in 1815 and 1818, but was both times vetoed by the King before being passed with a large majority the third time. It initiated the abolition of all noble titles and privileges, while the current nobility and their living legitimate children were allowed to keep their noble status or titles and certain privileges for the rest of their lives. Under the law, nobles who wished to present a claim to nobility before the Norwegian parliament were required to provide documentation confirming their noble status.

Text in English
§ 1. The countships and the barony in Norway shall, in regard to the administration of the functions of the civil authorities, be placed either under the county wherein the estates are located or under the nearest county; however, the countships may together constitute a county if it most graciously should please His Majesty to appoint for them their own authority.

The assumption of administration by the respective county governor (prefect) shall be effective from 1 October this year.

§ 2. As soon as the currently appointed  judges withdraw, in the aforementioned districts all decisions in cases in the second instance, and other functions proper to the  things, shall be placed in the superior court in the bishopric in which the district is located.

§ 3. The right previously accorded to counts, barons and noblemen, resulting from their privileges or the laws, to appoint or to propose clerical or civil officials on their estates is, in accordance with § 21 of the Constitution, entirely abolished.

§ 4. Likewise, the so-called "neck and hand," or the duty imposed on the nobility to have criminals on their estates arrested, prosecuted, and punished, together with the right of term and restitution following from it and accruing to the nobility, shall henceforth be abolished, so that hereafter, with respect to the arrest, prosecution, and punishment of criminals, as well as the imposition of fines, it shall occur on the estates of the nobility according to the regulations generally in force in the kingdom.

§ 5. The freedom from taxes and tithes to which counts and barons are at the present time entitled with respect to the dues for their primary farm and for a certain quantity of associated tenant farms, together with the freedom from taxes and tithes to which noblemen resident on farms are entitled with respect to their primary farms, shall terminate with the present fief holders or owners, and not be passed down to their heir.

§ 6. The rest of the present privileges and prerogatives of the nobility shall, insofar as they do not conflict with § 108 of the Constitution, remain for the noblemen who today are in possession thereof and for their children born in lawful wedlock at the time of publication of this law, such that they shall retain the same for their lifetime, as long as they legally prove their title thereto before the next regular Storting. After the deaths of these persons, who thus remain in possession of certain noble rights, all hereditary noble status here in the kingdom ceases to exist.

§ 7. Anyone who does not prove his nobility with legal documents before the next regular Storting shall have forfeited his right to present claims of nobility in the future either for himself or for the children whom he now has.

Original text in Danish
§ 1. 

§ 2. 

§ 3. 

§ 4. 

§ 5. 

§ 6. 

§ 7.

List
 

The 18th family, Bergh, withdrew their claim, and the claims of Captain Brømbsen and F.J. Cold were dismissed as unproven.

See also
 Norwegian nobility
 Norwegian noble titles

References

Literature
 Paulsen, P.I. (1931) Norges Lover 1660–1930. Grøndahls & Søns Boktrykkeri, Oslo. pp. 93–94.
 Storthings-Efterretninger 1814–1833

External links
 Lov, angaaende Modificationer og nærmere Bestemmelser af den Norske Adels Rettigheder: Act concerning Modifications and further decisions on the Rights of the Norwegian Nobility text at Dag Trygsland Hoelseth's site 

Norwegian nobility
Norwegian noble titles
Legal history of Norway
1821 in Norway
Succession acts